Knave or Not? is a 1798 comedy play by the British writer Thomas Holcroft.

The original Drury Lane cast included John Palmer as Monsrose, Richard Wroughton as Sir Guy Taunton, Richard Suett as Sir Job Ferment, Ralph Wewitzer as Mr Taunton, William Barrymore as Oliver, John Bannister as Jonas, Thomas Hollingsworth as Mr Quake, Jane Pope as Lady Ferment and Dorothea Jordan as Susan.

References

Bibliography
 Nicoll, Allardyce. A History of English Drama 1660–1900: Volume III. Cambridge University Press, 2009.
 Hogan, C.B (ed.) The London Stage, 1660–1800: Volume V. Southern Illinois University Press, 1968.

1798 plays
Comedy plays
West End plays
Plays by Thomas Holcroft